The United States Post Office is a historic post office building located at Lockport in Niagara County, New York. It was designed and built 1902–1904, and is one of a number of post offices in New York State designed by the Office of the Supervising Architect of the Treasury Department, James Knox Taylor.  It is a three-story brick and limestone structure in the Beaux-Arts style. The United States District Court for the Western District of New York met here from 1904 until 1916.

It was listed on the National Register of Historic Places in 1989.

References

External links
US Post Office-Lockport - U.S. National Register of Historic Places on Waymarking.com
Historic Federal Courthouses page from the Federal Judicial Center

Lockport
Lockport
Government buildings completed in 1904
Buildings and structures in Niagara County, New York
National Register of Historic Places in Niagara County, New York